Mozart is an unincorporated community in Marshall and Ohio counties in the U.S. state of West Virginia. It lies at an elevation of 1,260 feet (384 m).

References

Unincorporated communities in Marshall County, West Virginia
Unincorporated communities in Ohio County, West Virginia
Unincorporated communities in West Virginia